Abitibi Canyon Generating Station is a hydroelectric power plant owned by Ontario Power Generation on the Abitibi River.  The station is located 80 km north of Smooth Rock Falls, within Pitt Township in Northern Unorganized Cochrane District, in Ontario, Canada.

This facility is the fifth downstream hydroelectric plant of six on the Abitibi River. Designed by George F. Hardy Company, the construction of this 349 MW facility began in 1930 and became fully operational in 1936. Hydro One has a 500 kV transmission line along with a 230 kV line that runs south to Sudbury and continues all the way to Toronto to interconnect with the rest of the 500 kV network in Ontario.

Abitibi Canyon community

In 1930, a colony was established to house the employees of the plant and their families. About 130 people lived in the community which contained 30 homes, a community hall, skating rink, shooting range, school, hospital, general store, post office and church. By 1982, the community had expanded to about 300 residents.

See also 

 List of generating stations in Canada
 List of generating stations in Ontario

References

Hydroelectric power stations in Ontario
Buildings and structures in Cochrane District
Ontario Hydro
Ontario Power Generation
Dams in Ontario
Energy infrastructure completed in 1933
Energy infrastructure completed in 1936